Helge Barstad (9 May 1928 – 22 September 2012) was a Norwegian judge and politician for the Conservative Party born in Vartdal.

He was mayor of Førde from 1979 to 1981. In 1981, when the Willoch's First Cabinet assumed office, he was appointed state secretary in the Ministry of Agriculture. He held this position until 1983. Outside of politics, he was a land consolidation judge. He died in September 2012.

His daughter, Hilde Barstad, became a politician too.

References

1928 births
2012 deaths
People from Ørsta
People from Førde
Norwegian judges
Conservative Party (Norway) politicians
Norwegian state secretaries
Mayors of places in Sogn og Fjordane